Edward Sealy Nicholson (10 June 1912 – 16 March 1992), known as Ernie was a rugby union hooker who played 5 times for  in 1935 and 1936.  He played his club rugby for Leicester Tigers and Oxford University.

He made his debut on 19 January 1935 against  at Twickenham in a 3–3 draw.

Nicholson played 8 games for Leicester Tigers in the 1935–36 season. His debut was 5 October 1935, in a loss against Coventry and his final game was on 11 January 1936 in a 16–6 loss to Gloucester.  His final England game was against  on 18 January 1936 in a 0-0 draw as part of the 1936 Home Nations Championship.

References

1912 births
1992 deaths
English rugby union players
England international rugby union players
Rugby union hookers
Leicester Tigers players
Rugby union players from Somerset